Ilovka is a small settlement in the Municipality of Kranj in the Upper Carniola region of Slovenia.

References

External links
Ilovka on Geopedia

Populated places in the City Municipality of Kranj